RBS may refer to:

Organisations

Banking
 The Royal Bank of Scotland, a retail banking subsidiary of NatWest Group
 RBS International, the offshore banking arm of NatWest Group

Education
 Regent's Business School
 Rotterdam Business School
 Rutgers Business School
 Riga Business School

Other
 RBS TV, now GMA Network, owned by GMA Network Inc., Philippines
 Grupo RBS, Brazilian media group
 RBS TV 
 Regionalverkehr Bern Solothurn, Swiss transport company

Science and technology
 Radar Brake Support, Suzuki's Advanced Emergency Braking System
Radio Base Station, in wireless communications
 Reduction breast surgery, commonly known as breast reduction
 Redundant Braking System, a type of parachute system
Ribosomal Binding Site, in biology
 Roberts syndrome
Roussin's black salt, a chemical compound
 Rutherford backscattering spectrometry, an analytical technique

Computing
 Robbed-bit signaling
 Role-based security
 Rule-based system
 Remote backup service
 Reference Broadcast Time Synchronization

Other uses
 Reusable Booster System, a United States Air Force research program  circa 2010 to 2012
 Resource breakdown structure
 Risk breakdown structure
 Ramat Beit Shemesh, a city in Israel
 Rolling ball sculpture
 Revised British Standard, a bullhead rail profile
 Real Bout Fatal Fury Special, a fighting game
 Red Band Society, a Fox TV show that aired from 2014-15
 Rugby–Birmingham–Stafford Line, a railway line in England
 Orbost Airport, IATA airport code "RBS"

See also
 RBS-15, a long-range missile
 RBS 70, man-portable anti-aircraft weapon